The Swansea barrage (or the Tawe barrage) was completed in 1992 creating a new marina at the mouth of the River Tawe extending the leisure boat facilities already being offered by the old South Dock.

The barrage structure includes a boat lock, spillway, fish pass and generator turbine.  The turbine serves a dual use: acting as a power generator for the National Grid as well as being used to pump water back into the Tawe river system.

The barrage scheme gave rise to a number of environmental concerns. Fish navigation up the river and dissolved oxygen levels were problems that arose after completion.  Salt water that came in at high spring tides sank to the bottom and stayed there, reducing oxygen levels. The Environmental Advice Centre was commissioned to undertake an aeration scheme trial in the River Tawe in the summer of 1998. The system was based on a diffuser design and propeller mixer, which proved highly effective at exporting the saltwater from the deep area of the trial site and raising dissolved oxygen concentrations at the bed.

Following the success of the trial system a more extensive system was designed for the river for installation in 1999 -2000. The first stage of the installation of the designed system was undertaken in June 1999 and comprised a combination of diffusers and a large propeller mixer.

The installation was conducted using a diving team to ensure optimal location of the diffusers within the river channel.

Monitoring results from the system installed to date have indicated that aeration has effectively raised the oxygen concentration and assisted in the export of saline water from the system. Following the success of this work the Environmental Advice Centre is currently examining designs for other reaches of tidal river within the United Kingdom that display similar problems.

Following the success of the River Tawe aeration scheme the neighbouring Welsh city of Cardiff used the same method to improve the quality of the water in its newly created bay.

Other fears that arose with the building of the barrage such as the raising of the water table causing ground subsidence problems in the low-lying areas around the River Tawe.  Since completion, no significant subsidence problems have arisen.

Notes

External links

The Tawe River and Swansea Harbour

Dams completed in 1992
Energy infrastructure completed in 1992
Buildings and structures in Swansea
Dams in Wales
Tidal barrages
Swansea Bay
Hydroelectric power stations in Wales
Pumped-storage hydroelectric power stations in the United Kingdom